Guarani Esporte Clube, also known as Guarani, is a Brazilian football club based in Divinópolis, Minas Gerais state. It's the most traditional club on the West of Minas Gerais State. Nowadays, the club has been in a renovation time, with the new directorship.

History
The club was founded on September 20, 1930. They won the Campeonato Mineiro Third Level in 1994, and the Campeonato Mineiro Módulo II in 2002, 2010 and in 2018.
Guarani had its best performance in National Competitions in 1981, when the club finished Taça de Bronze, now called Campeonato Brasileiro - Série C, in the 4th place.

Achievements

 Campeonato Mineiro Módulo II:
 Winners (3): 2002, 2010, 2018
 Campeonato Mineiro Segunda Divisão:
 Winners (1): 1994

Stadium
Guarani Esporte Clube play their home games at Estádio Waldemar Teixeira de Faria, nicknamed Farião. The stadium has a maximum capacity of 4,080 people.

References

External links 
  Official website

Association football clubs established in 1930
Football clubs in Minas Gerais
1930 establishments in Brazil